Pavel Trávníček (born October 26, 1950) is a Czech actor. He has appeared in more than 70 film and television productions since 1971, most of them produced in Czechoslovakia/Czech Republic, occasionally in Germany. 

Trávníček is probably best-known for his starring role as the Prince in the fairy-tale film Tři oříšky pro Popelku (Three Nuts for Cinderella), a holiday classic in many European countries. He subsequently portrayed a number of leading roles in fairy-tale films during the 1970s and 1980s, including Třetí princ (The Third Prince, 1983), in which he was reunited with his Tři oříšky pro Popelku co-star Libuše Šafránková. In 1998, he founded his own theatre Skelet in Prague.

He has married four times and married his fourth wife, Monika, in 2015; they have a son born in December 2016. He also has two adult sons from his previous marriages.

Filmography (selection)
 Hry lásky šálivé (1971)
 Tři oříšky pro Popelku (1973)
 Sebechlebskí hudci (1976)
 Příbeh lásky a cti (1978)
 Schneeweißchen und Rosenrot (1979, GDR)
 Třetí princ (1983)
 Podivná přátelství herce Jesenia (1985)
 Vyprávěj (2009–2013, TV series, 18 episodes)
 Der große Rudolph (2018)

References

External links

1950 births
Living people
Czech male film actors
Czech male voice actors
Czech television actors
20th-century Czech male actors
21st-century Czech male actors
People from Konice
Janáček Academy of Music and Performing Arts alumni
Recipients of Medal of Merit (Czech Republic)